Flowing Rivers is the debut studio album by English singer-songwriter Andy Gibb. The album was produced by Albhy Galuten and Karl Richardson, with Barry Gibb on two tracks. It was released in September 1977 on RSO. Flowing Rivers was re-released by Polydor Records in 1998 in CD version.

Although the album is not currently in print, it was released to iTunes along with the other two Andy Gibb albums in 2011. From the album, two singles were released, "I Just Want to Be Your Everything" and "(Love Is) Thicker Than Water" (both peaked No. 1 in the US). Amy Hanson of AllMusic considered the songs in this LP as classic rock. The album was mainly produced by Albhy Galuten and Karl Richardson, with Barry Gibb on two songs.

Background
In August 1973, at the age of 15, Gibb made his first recordings at the Nova Sound Studios in London. The songs are "Windows of My World" and the country number "My Father's a Rebel"  The second song was written by Maurice Gibb (according to a November 1973 fans club newsletter) who also produced the session. At the urging of his brother, Barry, Gibb returned to Australia in 1974. Barry believed that since Australia had been a good training ground for the Bee Gees, it would also help Andy's career.

While in Australia, Gibb recorded demos of his compositions as well as his own renditions of an old numbers. After the release of his first single, "Words and Music" he performed it on the Australian TV called The Ernie Sigley Show.

When Gibb had got the call from his brother Barry in June 1976 as he and Col Joye's company ATA had proceeded with the new single ("Words and Music") knowing that Gibb would go to Florida later that year, while his last recording session before moving to the US, including "In the End", "Flowing Rivers", "Come Home for the Winter" and "Let It Be Me" were re-recorded in Criteria.

Recording
Gibb recorded an album of songs at Criteria around October 1976. He came to Miami in September and the sessions at Criteria are known to have coincided with the Eagles recording Hotel California, which they completed in October. Eagles member Joe Walsh plays on two tracks and Andy said that listening to some of the Eagles' songs influenced the sound he wanted on his album. The sessions were produced by Albhy Galuten and Karl Richardson, and with Barry on two songs, Galuten chose the experienced musicians who play on the album. The core group was Joey Murcia and Tim Renwick on guitar, Paul Harris and Galuten himself on piano and keyboards and Harold Cowart and Ron Ziegler on bass and drums. For some songs, they were joined by other top session players. Barry was very impressed with the polished sound of the session players. Barry was present to record only two songs ("I Just Want to Be Your Everything" and "(Love Is) Thicker Than Water") the two that he wrote for Andy, and although Andy said it ["Love Is (Thicker Than Water)"] was almost entirely Barry's work, it does sound a little closer to Andy's style.

On the album sessions, the title track was recorded for the third time. On Gibb's compositions, the tracks are a mix of country music and ballads. Galuten also contributed, writing "Dance to the Light of the Morning" and "Too Many Looks in Your Eyes".

Aftermath

The first Andy Gibb album was finally issued almost a year after it was recorded, carefully spaced between the Bee Gees releases. Andy wrote eight of the ten songs and Barry contributed to two. Andy was very suddenly very big in America, where both of the singles hit number 1. Unfortunately the ill effects of what Barry calls "first fame" had already claimed him by now. The title track was originally intended to be released by RSO as a single at the same time as "Love Is (Thicker Than Water)" but in favor of "Shadow Dancing" (later released on his next album), it was withdrawn.

After the release of Flowing Rivers, Andy revealed:

Track listing
All tracks written and composed by Andy Gibb, except where noted.

Personnel
 Andy Gibb – vocals
 Barry Gibb – background and harmony vocals on "I Just Want to Be Your Everything", "(Love Is) Thicker Than Water"
 John Sambataro – background vocals
 Joey Murcia – guitar
 George Terry – guitar
 Joe Walsh – guitar on "I Just Want to Be Your Everything", "(Love Is) Thicker Than Water"
 Don Buzzard – steel guitar
 Paul Harris – piano, keyboards
 Albhy Galuten – synthesizer, orchestral arrangement
 Harold Cowart – bass guitar
 Ron Ziegler – drums
 Nelson Pedron – percussion
 Mike Lewis – conductor
 Karl Richardson – sound engineer
 Steve Gersky – sound engineer

Charts

Weekly charts

Year-end charts

References

1977 debut albums
Andy Gibb albums
Albums produced by Barry Gibb
RSO Records albums